Matías Gabriel Rosso (born 12 March 1993) is an Argentine professional footballer who plays as a midfielder for Argentine Primera División side Estudiantes (LP).

Career
Chacarita Juniors of the Primera B Metropolitana were Rosso's first senior club, he joined their first-team in 2013 and made his professional debut in August in a goalless draw with Tristán Suárez. He scored the first goal of his career on 3 November against Villa Dálmine. In total, Rosso scored six goals in twenty-nine games in his debut campaign. Four goals in nineteen followed in 2014 as Chacarita won promotion to Primera B Nacional. Rosso was subsequently signed by Argentine Primera División side Estudiantes (LP) in January 2015. His debut came on 13 February vs. Independiente del Valle in the Copa Libertadores.

After eight games for Estudiantes (LP), Rosso departed to join Aldosivi on loan in January 2016. His stay was short as he returned to La Plata following just three appearances. On 8 July, Rosso rejoined Chacarita Juniors on loan. However, he returned to his parent club six months later as he failed to make an appearance, appearing on the bench once. Rosso completed a third loan away from Estudiantes (LP) to join their namesakes - Estudiantes (BA). He remained with Estudiantes (BA) for two seasons and made ten appearances, he also scored on his debut; a 3–2 Primera B Metropolitana win over Talleres.

Career statistics
.

Personal life
He is the brother of fellow footballer Federico Rosso.

References

External links

1993 births
Living people
Footballers from Rosario, Santa Fe
Argentine footballers
Association football midfielders
Primera B Metropolitana players
Argentine Primera División players
Primera Nacional players
Chacarita Juniors footballers
Estudiantes de La Plata footballers
Aldosivi footballers
Estudiantes de Buenos Aires footballers